Kombat Opera Presents is a BBC2 comedy show. The comedy parodies British television programmes by transforming them into operas. The music for the series was written by Richard Thomas, with the series having its origins in the Kombat Opera segments of Simon Munnery's character The League Against Tedium, and his television show Attention Scum. The series won the Best Comedy prize at the 2008 Rose d'Or ceremony.

Parodied shows
The following TV shows have been parodied:

Episode 1: The Applicants
 Originally broadcast on 25 February 2007
 A parody of The Apprentice

Episode 2: Spouse Change
 Originally broadcast on 4 March 2007
 A parody of Wife Swap

Episode 3: Question Time Out
 Originally broadcast on 11 March 2007
 A parody of Question Time

Episode 4: Manorama
 Originally broadcast on 18 March 2007
 A parody of Panorama

Episode 5: The South Bragg Show
 Originally broadcast on 25 March 2007
 A parody of The South Bank Show

References

External links

 

BBC television comedy